Kassina arboricola, sometimes known as the Ivory Coast running frog, is a species of frog in the family Hyperoliidae. It is found in southwestern Ghana and westward to south-central Ivory Coast. It occurs in secondary forests and forest edges, and to very limited extent, degraded former forest (farm bush). Breeding takes place in both temporary and permanent bodies of water, although it favours large, well-vegetated pools. It is probably negatively impacted by severe deforestation caused by agricultural expansion, logging, and growing human settlements.

References

arboricola
Amphibians described in 1985
Amphibians of West Africa
Taxonomy articles created by Polbot